2015 International North West 200 was the 76th running of the motorcycle road racing event which took place between 11–16 May 2015 at the circuit, known as "The Triangle", based around the towns of Portstewart, Coleraine and Portrush, in Northern Ireland.

Results

Practice

Race Results

Race 1; 600cc Supersport Race 1 final standings
Thursday 14 May 2015 6 laps – 53.656 miles

Fastest Lap: Alastair Seeley – Suzuki, 4 minutes, 35.818 seconds;  on lap 5

Race 2; 650cc Super-Twins Race final standings
Thursday 14 May 2015 4 laps – 35.724 miles

Fastest Lap: Ryan Farquhar – Kawasaki, 4 minutes, 59.172 seconds;  on lap 4

Race 3; 600cc Supersport Race 2 final standings
Saturday 16 May 2015 6 laps – 53.656 miles

Fastest Lap: Alastair Seeley – Suzuki, 4 minutes, 36.197 seconds;  on lap 6

Race 4; 1000cc Superbike Race final standings
Saturday 16 May 2015 5 laps – 53.656 miles

Fastest Lap: Alastair Seeley – BMW, 4 minutes, 24.760 seconds;  on lap 5

See also
North West 200 – History and results from the event

References

External links

BBC North West 200 website

2015
2015 in British motorsport
Sport in County Londonderry
Sport in County Antrim
2015 in Northern Ireland sport
Coleraine
2015 in motorcycle sport
May 2015 sports events in the United Kingdom